Alisan is a given name. Notable people with the name include:

Alisan Porter (born 1981), American singer, actress, and dancer

See also
Alişan (given name), Turkish name